Johann Jakob Humann (7 May 1771, Strasbourg – 19 August 1834, Mainz) was a German Roman Catholic clergyman. From 1860 he was vicar general of the Roman Catholic Diocese of Mainz and then Vicar Apostolic for the new Roman Catholic Diocese of Speyer from 1817 to 1821. He also served as Mainz's Vicar Apostolic from 1818 to 1830 and briefly as its bishop in 1834.

Sources
http://www.catholic-hierarchy.org/bishop/bhumann.html

1771 births
1834 deaths
Bishops of Mainz (1802-present)
Clergy from Strasbourg